Soy Nero is a 2016 internationally co-produced drama film directed by Rafi Pitts. It was selected to compete for the Golden Bear at the 66th Berlin International Film Festival. The film won the Best Film Award at the 12th Bucharest International Film Festival held in April 2016.

Cast
 Johnny Ortiz as Nero
 Rory Cochrane as Sgt. McCloud
 Khleo Thomas as Mohammed
 Aml Ameen as Bronx
 Michael Harney as Seymour
 Joel McKinnon Miller as Sgt. Frank White
 Darrell Britt-Gibson as Private Compton
 Alex Frost as Beverly Hills Police Officer
 Richard Portnow as Murray
 Rosa Frausto as Merecedes

References

External links
 

2016 films
2016 drama films
German drama films
French drama films
Mexican drama films
2010s Spanish-language films
Films directed by Rafi Pitts
2010s French films
2010s German films
2010s Mexican films